The War Horse is a 1927 American drama film written and directed by Lambert Hillyer and starring Buck Jones, Lola Todd, Lloyd Whitlock, Stanley Taylor, Yola d'Avril and James Gordon. It was released on February 6, 1927, by Fox Film Corporation.

Cast        
Buck Jones as Buck Thomas
Lola Todd as Audrey Evans
Lloyd Whitlock as Captain Collins
Stanley Taylor as Lieutenant Caldwell
Yola d'Avril as Yvonne
James Gordon as General Evans

References

External links
 

1927 films
1920s English-language films
Silent American drama films
1927 drama films
Fox Film films
Films directed by Lambert Hillyer
American silent feature films
American black-and-white films
1920s American films